Tracadie-Fort Augustus is a former provincial electoral district for the Legislative Assembly of Prince Edward Island, Canada.

The district was created prior to the 1993 Prince Edward Island general election out of part of 3rd Queens and a small part of 2nd Kings.

The district was dissolved in the redistribution that preceded the 2007 Prince Edward Island general election into Tracadie-Hillsborough Park, Morell-Mermaid and Vernon River-Stratford.

Members
The riding has elected the following Members of the Legislative Assembly:

Election results

References

Former provincial electoral districts of Prince Edward Island